Leonid Joseph Carbol (June 5, 1908 — November 13, 1991) was a Canadian ice hockey defenceman. He played 6 games for the Chicago Black Hawks of the National Hockey League during the 1942–43 season. The rest of his career, which lasted from 1929 to 1946, was mainly spent with the St. Louis Flyers of the American Hockey Association

Career statistics

Regular season and playoffs

External links
 

1908 births
1991 deaths
Buffalo Majors players
Canadian expatriate ice hockey players in the United States
Canadian ice hockey defencemen
Chicago Blackhawks players
Detroit Olympics (IHL) players
Ice hockey people from Ottawa
Minneapolis Millers (AHA) players
St. Louis Flyers (AHA) players
St. Louis Flyers players
Seattle Eskimos players